Onsu County and from Mandarin Chinese Wensu County, is a county in the Xinjiang Uyghur Autonomous Region and is under the administration of the Aksu Prefecture, bordering Kyrgyzstan's Issyk-Kul Region to the northwest.

Etymology 
The toponym Wensu had appeared in historical records of the Western Han Dynasty as one of the 36 states in the Western Regions. The name 'Onsu' (Wensu) means "ten water" in Uyghur and other Turkic languages. The name is similar to that of the nearby Zhetysu region which means "seven rivers"- both names consist of a number followed by 'su' (river; water). The name Aksu is Turkic for 'white water'.

In Uyghur, the county is called Aksu Konaxahar meaning 'the old city of Aksu'.

History 
Onsu County was established in 1902.

On May 29, 1958, Onsu County was eliminated and its territory made part of Aksu County. In 1962, Onsu County was restored.

In a Radio Free Asia interview, a Han Chinese staffer in the Onsu County local government said that in July 2017, a policy to affix QR codes to all knives belonging to Uyghurs was being carried out.

As of March 2018, every cadre in the county was required to spend eight days a month at the home of villagers.

In the late 2010s, Onsu County was the site of vocational education and training centers (also understood as re-education camps or concentration camps). According to a Radio Free Asia interview with an officer at the Onsu county police station, as of August 2018, 30,000 persons, or about one in six Uyghurs in the county (approximately 16% of the overall population of the county), were detained in re-education camps.

Administrative divisions 
Towns ( / ):
Wensu Town (Onsu; ئونسۇ بازىرى / 温宿镇), Tumxuk (Tumuxiuke, Tumshuq; تۇمشۇق بازىرى / , formerly 吐木秀克乡), Qizil (Kezile;  / , formerly ), Aral (Arele;  / , formerly ), Jam (Jiamu;  / , formerly ), Tuofuhan (托甫汗镇), Gongqingtuan (共青团镇), Kekeya (柯柯牙镇)

Townships ( / ):
Toxula Township (Tuohula;  / ), Chaghraq Township (Qiagelake; چاغراق يېزىسى / 恰格拉克乡), Ishlemchi Township (Yixilaimuqi; ئىشلەمچى يېزىسى / 依希来木其乡), Gulawat Township (Gule Awati; گۈلئاۋات يېزىسى / 古勒阿瓦提乡), Bozdong Kyrgyz Ethnic Township (Bozidun, Baozidun; بوزدۆڭ قىرغىز يېزىسى / 博孜墩柯尔克孜族乡 / 包孜墩柯尔克孜族乡)

Climate

Economy 
Agricultural products include rice, wheat, corn, cotton and fruit products. Sheep wool and sheepskins are produced in abundance. Industries produce food, spun cotton, building materials and coal.

, there was about 139,200 acres (919,475 mu) of cultivated land in Onsu.

Demographics 

As of 2015, 197,360 of the 259,305 residents of the county were Uyghur, 55,335 were Han Chinese and 6,610 were from other ethnic groups.

As of 1999, 76.17% of the population of Onsu (Wensu) County was Uyghur and 21.43% of the population was Han Chinese.

Transportation 
 China National Highway 314

Historical maps 
Historical English-language maps including Onsu:

Notes

References 

County-level divisions of Xinjiang
Aksu Prefecture